The Asiatic Cavalry Division was a White Army cavalry division during the Russian Civil War. The division was composed of Russians, Buryats, Tatars, Bashkirs, Mongols of different tribes, Chinese, Manchu, Polish exiles and many others.

Formation 
The division was formed in Transbaikal by Baron Roman von Ungern-Sternberg on 28 May 1919. It consisted of the remnants from the White Army's disbanded Native Horse Corps. It was 8,000-man strong.

History 
Since 18 March 1920, it was directly subordinate to the Commander-in-Chief of all the Russian Eastern Regions' armed forces, Ataman Semenov, and from 21 May 1920, in the Far Eastern Army.

 After Kolchak's defeat at the hands of the Red Army and the subsequent decision of Japan to withdraw its expeditionary troops from the Transbaikal, Semyonov, unable to withstand the pressure of Bolshevik forces, planned a retreat to Manchuria.

Ungern, however, saw it as an opportunity to implement his monarchist plan. On 7 August 1920, he broke his allegiance to Semyonov and transformed his Asiatic Cavalry Division into a guerrilla detachment. Later that same month, the unit crossed the Mongolia–Russia border due to the Red Army's and the Far Eastern Republic's People's Revolutionary Army's attacks. This move to Mongolia was unauthorized by Semenov. In Mongolia, the detachment united with other forces of the White Army, e.g. the units of Colonels N. N. Kazagrandi and A. P. Kaigorodov, in order to combat the Chinese and Red forces. On September 29, the division was excluded from Semenov's Far Eastern Army. During the evacuation of the Far Eastern Army from Transbaikal to Primorye along the CER, the division went a different route.

On 2 October 1920 the division, totalling 900 men, with its four regiments and artillery, entered Mongolia when Bogd Khan agreed to von Ungern-Sternberg's offer to liberate Mongolia from the Chinese occupiers. The division's fighting core were eight Transbaikal Cossack squadrons. The division freed the Mongolian capital Urga from the Chinese and tried twice to break through in Transbaikal, but suffered heavy losses. In June 1921 the division consisted of 3,500 men, but lost up to 66% of them in the battle of Troitskosavsky. In the final clash, von Ungern's forces numbered about 1,000 soldiers. During the retreat, outraged by the cruel treatment of the commander, the officers expelled Ungern, and the division, in 2 brigades under the command of Esaul Makeev and then Colonel Ostrovsky (actual leadership Colonel M.G. Tornovsky), moved to Manchuria where in August 1921 it was disarmed.

References

Citations

Sources
 

Cavalry divisions
Military units and formations of White Russia (Russian Civil War)
Military units and formations established in 1919
Military units and formations disestablished in 1921